Dwarka Nath Tiwary (born 1901)  was an Indian politician from Bihar. He was a member of Lok Sabha for four  terms from Gopalganj. He participated in Indian independence movement and was imprisoned.

References

1901 births
Lok Sabha members from Bihar
Pro tem Speakers of the Lok Sabha
People from Gopalganj district, India
Indian independence activists from Bihar
India MPs 1952–1957
India MPs 1957–1962
India MPs 1962–1967
India MPs 1967–1970
India MPs 1971–1977
India MPs 1977–1979
Year of death missing
Congress for Democracy politicians
Indian National Congress politicians from Bihar